Marcelo Méndez may refer to:
 Marcelo Méndez (footballer)
 Marcelo Méndez (volleyball)
 Marcelo Méndez (fencer)